Anti-Disengagement may refer to:
Engagement (disambiguation), through a double negative prefix
Disengagement (disambiguation), opposition
Israeli disengagement from Gaza, opposition

See also
 Engagement